Chetilla District is one of twelve districts of the province Cajamarca in Peru.

Along with Porcón (Cajamarca District) and Los Baños del Inca but in contrast to the rest of the Cajamarca Region, Chetilla is traditional Quechua-speaking area. However, the Cajamarca Quechua is under strong pressure from Spanish.

References